Istiglal Order, is the highest supreme order of the Republic of Azerbaijan, along with Heydar Aliyev Order. presented by the President of the Republic of Azerbaijan. Istiglal means Sovereignty in Azerbaijani.

History and status
Istiglal Order was among several medals and orders, requested to be reviewed and created by the President Abulfaz Elchibey on November 10, 1992 by a Presidential Decree No. 370. The order was created by the Decree No. 754 of the President of Azerbaijan, Heydar Aliyev and ratified by National Assembly of Azerbaijan on December 6, 1993. The Istiglal Order is given to the Citizens of Azerbaijan for the following services:
for exceptional contributions to national independence movement of Azerbaijan;
distinguished services to Motherland and its people;
special contributions in statehood building of the country.

The order is pinned to the left side of the chest. If there are any other orders or medals, they are to follow Istiglal Order.

Description
Istiglal order is made of two silver layers of eight pointed stars placed on each other in proportion to symmetrical axis. The top one is colored with blue color and has an image of a bird with stretched wings. Between the wings, an eight pointed star with a word İstiqlal (Sovereignty) on top of it is engraved. The bird, star and "Istiglal" words engravements are in pure gold. The rear side of the order is polished and has an engraved order number.
The composition is attached to a blue colored watered silk ribbon bar with five edges.

Recipients
Alibaba Mammadov, Azerbaijani Mugam singer
Habil Aliyev, prominent Azerbaijani kamancheh player
Khalil Rza Uluturk, Azerbaijani poet
Mammad Araz, Azerbaijani poet
Bakhtiyar Vahabzadeh, Azerbaijani poet
Mirvarid Dilbazi, Azerbaijani poet
Mikayil Abdullayev, Azerbaijani painter
Anar Rzayev, Azerbaijani novelist and poet
Lutfiyar Imanov, Azerbaijani opera singer
Jalal Aliyev, member of National Assembly of Azerbaijan
Arif Malikov, Azerbaijani composer
Murtuz Alasgarov, former Speaker of the National Assembly of Azerbaijan
Tahir Salahov, Azerbaijani painter
Ziya Bunyadov, prominent Azerbaijani historian
Leyla Badirbeyli, Azerbaijani actress
Süleyman Demirel, former President of Turkey
Leonid Kuchma, former President of Ukraine
Allahshukur Pashazadeh, Sheikh ul-Islam and Grand Mufti of the Caucasus
Amina Dilbazi, Azerbaijani folk dancer
Khoshbakht Yusifzadeh, prominent Azerbaijani geologist
Eduard Shevardnadze, former President of Georgia
İhsan Doğramacı, Turkish academician
Togrul Narimanbekov, Azerbaijani painter
Mstislav Rostropovich, Russian cellist
Muslim Magomayev, Soviet and Azerbaijani baritone operatic and pop singer
Elchin Efendiyev, Azerbaijani writer, Deputy Prime Minister of Azerbaijan
Ion Iliescu, President of Romania
Nabi Khazri, Azerbaijani writer
Polad Bülbüloğlu, Azerbaijani singer, actor and politician
Artur Rasizade, Prime Minister of Azerbaijan
Fahd of Saudi Arabia, King of Saudi Arabia
Magsud Ibrahimbeyov, Azerbaijani writer and member of National Assembly of Azerbaijan
Vasif Adigozalov, Azerbaijani composer
Nikolai Baibakov, Russian statesman and economist
Abbas Abbasov, former Deputy Prime Minister of Azerbaijan
Zeynab Khanlarova, Azerbaijani folk singer
Arif Babayev, Azerbaijani Mugam singer
Ramiz Mehdiyev, professor and Head of Presidential Administration of Azerbaijan Republic
Fidan Gasimova, Azerbaijani Opera singer

References

Orders, decorations, and medals of Azerbaijan
Awards established in 1993
1993 establishments in Azerbaijan